The Order of Things is the seventh studio album by American metal band All That Remains. It was released on February 24, 2015, on Razor & Tie Records. The Order of Things is the first studio album to be produced by Josh Wilbur. It is also the final album to feature bassist Jeanne Sagan due to her departure from the band in September 2015. The album debuted at number 25 on the US Billboard 200, selling 19,150 copies in its first week only in the United States.

Background
The album was recorded and produced by Josh Wilbur.

The first song released from the album was "No Knock". The song was first posted by Labonte's pseudo-account called "Harrison Ford" with the video that was released on November 14, 2014 entitled "You Found Me".
It later on was posted by All That Remains official YouTube Channel.

Phil Labonte and producer Josh Wilbur wrote the lyrics for the album together, which is the first time in All That Remains catalogue. Phil Labonte stated about working with Josh: "Honestly, the test for me is, like, when me and Josh [got] done, 'cause we wrote the melodies and the lyrics together; none of the vocals were done before I actually sat down with Josh. This is the first time that anyone has ever had any kind of input onto lyrics. But Josh is the only guy that's actually worked with me about lyrics and stuff, and it's been completely wonderful." A music video was made for 'This Probably Won't End Well'.

The album art for this album is based on an upwards view of the ceiling of the Pantheon in Rome, Italy.

Musical style
Phil Labonte stated about the album: "I think this record is far and away better than our last one. It's, in my opinion, far and away better than 'Overcome'." Personally, I think that we have a lot of songs on the new album that are better. He also stated: "I think the record overall is probably leaning 'sing-y.' We've got 12 songs, and there's probably four or five songs that are beginning to end singing. There's some screaming worked into two or three."

Drummer Jason Costa stated about the album: "It definitely still sounds like us. But the heavy stuff is heavier, and the faster stuff is faster. We all really challenged ourselves on this album. And the radio stuff is more… not more radio, but there's definitely more singing, there's more melody and stuff like that. But the songs are fast; we have a lot of fast burners on this album. And the double-bass stuff for the heavier songs is really challenging for me this time. The patterns are super-hard, some of them."

Critical reception
Unlike the majority of the band's previous albums, The Order of Things received mixed to negative reviews from the critics.

Ultimate-Guitar gave the album a score of 5.3/10, saying that "the need to subdue the band's melodeath roots damages the full potential of the album, and the new raison d'être to be 'catchy metal' has the band throwing their hat into a crowded and homogenized ring. Ultimately, this investment in a different sound doesn't pay off".  Metalstorm.net gave the album a similar 5.6/10.  They lead their review with "All That Remains moved so far away from the sound that originally made them famous, that I will be bound to use apologetic and vague phrases that both express my lack of love for what I am hearing and yet still admit that I understand how one could like it." MusicReviewRadar gave the record 2/5 stars stating that a tragic ballad sadly defined the main line of the entire record.
Conversely Blabbermouth.net gave the album a positive 7.5/10, taking a more neutral standpoint on the controversial sound change.  "Phil Labonte and his team are joyously doing whatever the hell they want, praise or scorn them all you like."

Track listing
All lyrics written by Phil Labonte and all music by All That Remains.

Personnel
All That Remains

 Philip Labonte – lead vocals
 Oli Herbert – lead guitar
 Mike Martin – rhythm guitar
 Jeanne Sagan – bass guitar, backing vocals
 Jason Costa – drums

Additional

 Josh Wilbur – production, mixing, mastering
 Jim Fogarty – engineering
 Justin Borucki – photography
 Forefathers and Dan Bradley – design and layout

Charts

References

All That Remains (band) albums
2015 albums
Razor & Tie albums